Monica Jo Mancini (born May 4, 1952) is an American singer and the daughter of composer Henry Mancini.

Career
Mancini grew up in Northridge, California. Her father, Henry, was a popular, award winning composer and her mother, Virginia, was a singer. She listened more to the Beatles than to her father's music. When she was fourteen, she sang professionally with the Henry Mancini Chorus, as did her mother and sister. She became a freelance, studio singer in Los Angeles. Her debut album, Monica Mancini (1998) was accompanied by a television special on PBS. During her career, she has worked with Plácido Domingo, Quincy Jones and Michael Jackson.

Discography
 Monica Mancini (Warner Bros., 1998)
 Dreams of Johnny Mercer (Concord Jazz, 2000)
 Cinema Paradiso (Concord Jazz, 2002)
 Ultimate Mancini (2004)
 I've Loved These Days (Concord, 2009)

Personal life
Mancini is married to musician and producer Gregg Field.

References

External links 
 Official site

1952 births
Living people
American women jazz singers
American jazz singers
21st-century American women